Events in the year 1956 in Brazil.

Incumbents

Federal government
 President: Nereu Ramos (until 30 January), Juscelino Kubitschek (starting 31 January)
 Vice President: vacant (until 30 January), João Goulart (starting 31 January)

Governors 
 Alagoas: Arnon de Mello (until 31 January); Sebastião Muniz Falcão (from 31 January)
 Amazonas: Plínio Ramos Coelho 
 Bahia: Antônio Balbino 
 Ceará: Paulo Sarasate 
 Espírito Santo: Francisco Lacerda de Aguiar
 Goiás: José Ludovico de Almeida 
 Maranhão: 
 Mato Grosso: João Ponce de Arruda
 Minas Gerais: José Francisco Bias Fortes 
 Pará: 
 until 31 January: Zacarias de Assumpção 
 31 January-10 June: Edward Catete Pinheiro
 starting 10 June: Magalhães Barata
 Paraíba: José Américo de Almeida (until 31 January); Flávio Coutinho (from 31 January)
 Paraná: Adolfo de Oliveira Franco then Moisés Lupion
 Pernambuco: Osvaldo Cordeiro de Farias 
 Piauí: Jacob Gaioso e Almendra 
 Rio de Janeiro: Miguel Couto Filho                                                      
 Rio Grande do Norte: Silvio Piza Pedrosa (until 31 January); Dinarte de Medeiros Mariz (from 31 January)
 Rio Grande do Sul: Ildo Meneghetti 
 Santa Catarina: Irineu Bornhausen (until 31 January); Jorge Lacerda (from 31 January)
 São Paulo: Jânio Quadros 
 Sergipe: Leandro Maciel

Vice governors
 Alagoas: Sizenando Nabuco de Melo 
 Ceará: Wilson Gonçalves 
 Espírito Santo: Adwalter Ribeiro Soares
 Goiás: Bernardo Sayão Carvalho Araújo 
 Maranhão: Renato Bayma Archer da Silva (until 31 January); vacant thereafter (from 31 January)
 Mato Grosso: João Leite de Barros (until 31 January); Henrique José Vieira Neto (from 31 January)
 Minas Gerais: Artur Bernardes Filho (from 31 January)
 Paraíba: João Fernandes de Lima (until 31 January); Pedro Gondim (from 31 January)
 Piauí: Francisco Ferreira de Castro 
 Rio de Janeiro: Roberto Silveira
 Rio Grande do Norte: José Augusto Varela (from 31 January)
 Santa Catarina: José de Miranda Ramos (31 January-5 August); Heriberto Hülse (from 5 August)
 São Paulo: Porfírio da Paz 
 Sergipe: José Machado de Souza

Events 
September 5 - , a machine-tool manufacturer based in Santa Bárbara d'Oeste, begins producing the Isetta car under licence.
November 22 - Brazil sends a team of 44 athletes to compete in 28 events and 11 sports in the 1956 Summer Olympics in Melbourne, Australia.

Births 
January 5 - Celso Blues Boy, singer-songwriter and guitarist (died 2012)
February 29 - Luiz Duarte da Rocha, playwright, director and musician 
March 15 - Oswaldo Montenegro, singer
March 28 - Zizi Possi, singer
August 9 - Fafá de Belém, singer
December 28 - Cadão Volpato, musician, artist, journalist and write

Deaths 
February 28 - Florentino Ávidos, politician (born 1870)

References

See also 
1956 in Brazilian football
1956 in Brazilian television

 
1950s in Brazil
Years of the 20th century in Brazil
Brazil
Brazil